Nadie is the third EP by the Japanese doom metal band Corrupted, released in 1995. This was recorded at L.M. Studio in Osaka, Japan on May 27, 1995.

Track listing

References

1995 EPs
Corrupted (band) EPs